Rhododendron charitopes (雅容杜鹃) is a species of flowering plant in the family Ericaceae. The flowers are whitish pink to rose or purple.

References

Sources
 I. B. Balfour & Farrer, Notes Roy. Bot. Gard. Edinburgh. 13: 243. 1922.

charitopes
Taxa named by Isaac Bayley Balfour
Taxa named by Reginald Farrer